Misquicocha (possibly from Quechua misk'i sweet, qucha lake "sweet lake") is mountain in the north of the Cordillera Blanca in the Andes of Peru, about  high. It is located in the Ancash Region, Huaylas Province, Yuracmarca District. It lies southwest Champara.

References

Mountains of Peru
Mountains of Ancash Region
Lakes of Peru
Lakes of Ancash Region